José Fontanet (22 July 1900 – 31 December 1941) was a Spanish water polo player. He competed at the 1920 Summer Olympics and the 1924 Summer Olympics.

References

External links
 

1900 births
1941 deaths
Spanish male water polo players
Olympic water polo players of Spain
Water polo players at the 1920 Summer Olympics
Water polo players at the 1924 Summer Olympics
Water polo players from Barcelona
20th-century Spanish people